Mount Bierle is a mountain (2,360 m) rising 4.5 nautical miles (8 km) north of Mount Granholm in the Admiralty Mountains of the major geographical location, Victoria Land, Antarctica. The topographical feature was so mapped by the United States Geological Survey (USGS) from surveys and U.S. Navy air photos, 1960–63. Named by Advisory Committee on Antarctic Names (US-ACAN) for Donald A. Bierle, United States Antarctic Research Program (USARP) biologist at McMurdo Station, Hut Point Peninsula, Ross Island, 1966–67 and 1967–68. The mountain lies situated on the Pennell Coast, a portion of Antarctica lying between Cape Williams and Cape Adare.

Mountains of Victoria Land
Pennell Coast